Standard Fruit Company (now Dole plc) was established in the United States in 1924 by the Vaccaro brothers. Its forerunner was started in 1899, when Sicilian Arberesh immigrants Joseph, Luca and Felix Vaccaro, together with Salvador D'Antoni, began importing bananas to New Orleans from La Ceiba, Honduras. By 1915, the business had grown so large that it bought most of the ice factories in New Orleans in order to refrigerate its banana ships, leading to its president, Joseph Vaccaro, becoming known as the "Ice King".

Along with the United Fruit Company, Standard Fruit played a significant role in the governments of Honduras and other Central American countries, which became known as "banana republics" due to the high degree of control which the fruit companies held over the nations.

In 1926, the company changed its name from Standard Fruit Company to Standard Fruit & Steamship Company. Between 1964 and 1968, the company was acquired by the Castle & Cooke Corporation, which also acquired James Dole's Hawaiian Pineapple Company (HAPCO) around the same time. In 1991, Castle & Cooke was renamed Dole Food Company. Castle & Cooke Inc, a real estate company, was spun off in 1995 and, following a 2000 management buyout, is now privately held.

1954 Honduras Strike

In 1954 there was a general strike in Honduras against the Standard Fruit company among others. A detailed timeline can be seen below:

References

Further reading
Thomas L. Karnes, "Tropical Enterprise: The Standard Fruit & Steamship Company in Latin America", Baton Rouge: Louisiana State University Press, 1978

External links
 United Fruit Historical Society
 Dole Food Company, Inc. website

Dole plc
Defunct agriculture companies of the United States
Agriculture in Hawaii
Banana production
Pineapple production
Business in Hawaii
Defunct companies based in Hawaii
American companies established in 1924
Food and drink companies established in 1924
Food and drink companies disestablished in 1968
1924 establishments in Louisiana
1968 disestablishments in Louisiana
1968 mergers and acquisitions